William Pierce Matthews (born November 15, 1951) is a former American football running back in the National Football League (NFL).  He was drafted by the San Diego Chargers in the first round (second overall) of the 1974 NFL Draft.  Prior to playing for the Chargers, he played for the University of Colorado at Boulder. He played high school football at S. R. Butler High School in Huntsville, Alabama.

References

1951 births
Living people
Sportspeople from Huntsville, Alabama
American football running backs
Colorado Buffaloes football players
San Diego Chargers players
New York Giants players
Miami Dolphins players